3G Capital is a Brazilian-American multibillion-dollar investment firm, founded in 2004 by Alex Behring, Jorge Paulo Lemann, Carlos Alberto Sicupira, Marcel Herrmann Telles and Roberto Thompson Motta.

The firm is best known for implementing zero-based budgeting at its portfolio companies: Anheuser-Busch InBev, Restaurant Brands International (Burger King, Tim Hortons, and Popeyes Louisiana Kitchen), Kraft Heinz as well as partnering with Berkshire Hathaway for its acquisitions.

Notable deals
In 2010, the company acquired Burger King for $3.3 billion, and subsequently took the company private. The deal was announced in September 2010, and was finalized in November. Shareholders received $24.00 per share in cash. Under new management, Burger King introduced a reworked menu and marketing strategies. In June 2012, Burger King was once again listed as a publicly traded company through a $1.4 billion deal with Justice Holdings. Despite the relisting, 3G Capital retained a 71% stake of the company.

In December 2014, the Canadian government approved the purchase of Tim Hortons by 3G Capital for $12.5 billion. The acquisition merged Burger King with Tim Hortons as Restaurant Brands International.

On 25 March 2015, it was announced that 3G Capital was in "advanced talks" to buy Kraft Foods for $40 billion, and merge it with Heinz to form the world's fifth largest food company. Heinz was being advised in the transaction by Lazard and Kraft by Centerview Partners.

In 2019 the firm submitted bids for ThyssenKrupp AG, but stepped out the negotiations, ThyssenKrupp Elevator Technology unit was bought by a consortium for €17.2 billion.

In September 2021, Kraft Heinz announced that Hemmer, a Brazilian company focused on condiments and sauces, was being acquired for an undisclosed amount. This acquisition follows the recent agreement with Assan Foods – a Turkey company focused on sauces – belonging to Kibar Holding, for approximately $100 million.

On December 30, 2021, 3G Capital entered into a definitive agreement to acquire 75% of interest in Hunter Douglas, a global market leader in window coverings and a major manufacturer of architectural products. The deal was completed on February 25, 2022, for approximately US$ 7.1 billion.

3G Capital portfolio

Beverage 
 AB InBev (which owns Budweiser, Corona, Stella Artois and Guaraná Antarctica)
 Anheuser-Busch
 InBev
 AmBev
 Grupo Modelo
 SABMiller

Food 
 Kraft Heinz (which owns Oscar Mayer, Philadelphia, Hemmer and Quero)
 Kraft Foods
 H.J. Heinz Company

Restaurants 
 Restaurant Brands International
 Burger King
 Tim Hortons
 Popeyes Louisiana Kitchen
 Firehouse Subs

Retailing 
 Americanas (which owns Skoob, and retained Blockbusters rights)
 Americanas Express
 Americanas Local

Manufacturing 
 Hunter Douglas

E-commerce 
 B2W Digital (which owns Americanas, Submarino and Shoptime)

Offices and management
3G Capital has offices in Rio de Janeiro and New York City and the firm is run by managing partner Alex Behring in New York. The state of incorporation is the Cayman Islands.

References

External links

Financial services companies established in 2004
American companies established in 2004
Brazilian companies established in 2004
2004 establishments in New York City
Hedge fund firms in New York City
Companies based in Rio de Janeiro (city)
Private equity firms of Brazil
Investment companies based in New York City